Tube-snout is a common name for several fishes and may refer to:

Aulorhynchus flavidus, the only species currently included in the family Aulorhynchidae
Aulichthys japonicus, a species formerly included in the family Aulorhynchidae